The 2018 Loughborough Trophy was a professional tennis tournament played on indoor hard courts. It was the first edition of the tournament which was part of the 2018 ATP Challenger Tour. It took place in Loughborough, United Kingdom between 21 and 27 May 2018.

Singles main-draw entrants

Seeds

 1 Rankings are as of 14 May 2018.

Other entrants
The following players received wildcards into the singles main draw:
  Luke Bambridge
  Edward Corrie
  Lloyd Glasspool
  James Ward

The following player received entry into the singles main draw as a special exempt:
  Yosuke Watanuki

The following player received entry into the singles main draw using a protected ranking:
  Daniel Brands

The following players received entry from the qualifying draw:
  Dan Evans
  Frederik Nielsen
  Jurij Rodionov
  Emil Ruusuvuori

Champions

Singles

 Hiroki Moriya def.  James Ward 6–2, 7–5.

Doubles

 Frederik Nielsen /  Joe Salisbury def.  Luke Bambridge /  Jonny O'Mara 3–6, 6–3, [10–4].

References

2018 ATP Challenger Tour